Konoval or Konowal is a Slavic-language surname literally meaning the occupation of  konoval [ коновал ], an archaic term for "veterinarian". Variants include Koneval and Konefal. Notable people with this surname include:

 Filip Konowal (1887–1959), Ukrainian Canadian soldier
 Karin Konoval (born 1961), Canadian-American actress
 Victoria Konefal (born 1996), American actress

Ukrainian-language surnames